is a passenger railway station located in the city of Kawagoe, Saitama, Japan, operated by the East Japan Railway Company (JR East).

Lines

Station layout
The station has one unnumbered side platform serving a single bidirectional track. The station structure is located on the south side of the track. The station is staffed.

Platforms

History
The station opened on 22 July 1940. With the privatization of Japanese National Railways (JNR) on 1 April 1987, the station came under the control of JR East.

Passenger statistics
In fiscal 2019, the station was used by an average of 1337 passengers daily (boarding passengers only). The passenger figures for previous years are as shown below.

See also
 List of railway stations in Japan

References

External links

  

Railway stations in Saitama Prefecture
Railway stations in Japan opened in 1940
Kawagoe Line
Stations of East Japan Railway Company
Railway stations in Kawagoe, Saitama